Kampiti is a town located in the Dori Department, in the Séno Province in the region of Sahel in Burkina Faso.

Populated places in the Sahel Region